In geometry, the Conway triangle notation, named after John Horton Conway, allows trigonometric functions of a triangle to be managed algebraically. Given a reference triangle whose sides are a, b and c and whose corresponding internal angles are A, B, and C then the Conway triangle notation is simply represented as follows:

where S = 2 × area of reference triangle and
 

in particular

      where  is the Brocard angle. The law of cosines is used: .

    for values of     where   

Hence:

Some important identities:

where R is the circumradius and abc = 2SR and where r is the incenter,      and   

Some useful trigonometric conversions:

Some useful formulas:

Some examples using Conway triangle notation:

Let D be the distance between two points P and Q whose trilinear coordinates are pa : pb : pc and qa : qb : qc. Let Kp = apa + bpb + cpc and let Kq = aqa + bqb + cqc. Then D is given by the formula:

Using this formula it is possible to determine OH, the distance between the circumcenter and the orthocenter as follows:

For the circumcenter pa = aSA and for the orthocenter qa = SBSC/a

Hence:

This gives:

References
 

Triangle geometry
Trigonometry
John Horton Conway